Sabina Puértolas is a Spanish operatic soprano, who has performed leading roles  internationally, including Verdi's Gilda at the Royal Opera House and Rossini's Rosina at the Seattle Opera.

Early life and education
Sabina Puértolas was born in Zaragoza, Spain.

Career
Puértolas made her professional debut in 2001 as Oscar in Verdi's Un ballo in maschera at La Scala in Milan. She appeared at the Royal Opera House first in 2013 as Lisette in Puccini's La rondine, then also as Despina in Mozart's Così fan tutte. She performed at the Liceu in Barcelona both the Contessa di Folleville in Rossini's Il viaggio a Reims and Marie in Donizetti's La fille du régiment. She appeared as Fiorilla in Rossini's Il turco in Italia at the  Théâtre du Capitole in Toulouse, in the title role of Handel's Rodelinda at the Teatro Real in Madrid, and as Gilda in Verdi's Rigoletto at the Teatro Municipal in Santiago, Chile.

In the United States, she performed Rosina in Rosssini's  The Barber of Seville at the Seattle Opera in October 2017.

Her published recordings include 
 Handel's Ariodante under Alan Curtis (Virgin Classics label)'
 Handel's Alcina from La Monnaie (Alpha Classics label),
 José María Usandizaga's La llama (Deutsche Grammophon label).

She was the winner of international competitions in Rovereto, Pamplona, Palma de Mallorca, Manuel Ausensi in Barcelona, and the Zarzuela Prize at the 2003 Operalia.

Royal Opera House
On 4 January 2018, her performance as Gilda at the Royal Opera House in London was critically acclaimed, after she was called only the day before to temporarily replace Lucy Crowe, who had a throat infection, and having only three hours to rehearse. However, she had performed as Gilda previously in the municipal theatre in Santiago, Chile. Puértolas flew from Spain the next day to perform. It was considered a "do or die" opportunity. Replacing a high-profile soprano performing in a prestigious venue and being the main female character of the opera was met with thunderous applause as reported by the news media.  The saga of finding a replacement, with some candidates having singing obligations and others not having a visa to work in Britain, was covered internationally, including by the US, UK, and Spanish press.

References

External links
 
 

Living people
Year of birth missing (living people)
Spanish operatic sopranos
21st-century Spanish women  opera singers
People from Zaragoza